Largo Entertainment was a production company founded in 1989. It was run by film producer Lawrence Gordon and was backed by electronics firm Victor Company of Japan, Ltd. (JVC) in an investment that cost more than $100 million. The production company released their first film, Point Break in 1991 and their last film was Grey Owl in 1999.

History
In August 1989, Gordon formed Largo Entertainment with the backing of JVC, representing the first major Japanese investment in the entertainment industry. Although JVC put up the entire $100 million investment, the company was structured to be a 50/50 joint venture between Gordon and JVC. As the company's chairman and chief executive officer, Gordon was responsible for the production of such films as Point Break (1991), starring Patrick Swayze and Keanu Reeves; The Super (1991), starring Joe Pesci; Unlawful Entry (1992), starring Kurt Russell, Ray Liotta and Madeleine Stowe; Used People (1992), starring Shirley MacLaine, Jessica Tandy, Kathy Bates, Marcia Gay Harden and Marcello Mastroianni; and Timecop (1994), starring Jean-Claude Van Damme. Largo also co-financed and handled the foreign distribution of the acclaimed 1992 biopic Malcolm X, directed by Spike Lee and starring Denzel Washington in the title role. In January 1994, Gordon left the company and forged a production deal at Universal. In 1999, JVC transferred Largo's film acquisition assets to JVC Entertainment, a film subsidiary for the Japanese market, and shut down its foreign sales operation. Largo's film library was acquired by InterMedia in 2001.

Filmography

References

 
Mass media companies established in 1989
Mass media companies disestablished in 1999
Film production companies of the United States
Defunct film and television production companies of the United States